Ursula Büschking (born 23 September 1941) represented West Germany at the 1972 Summer Olympic Games in archery.

Career 

She competed in the 1972 Summer Olympic Games in the women's individual event and finished 30th with a score of 2200 points.

References

External links 

 Profile on worldarchery.org

1941 births
Living people
West German female archers
Olympic archers of West Germany
Archers at the 1972 Summer Olympics